This is a list of airlines currently operating in Kuwait.

Scheduled airlines

See also
 List of defunct airlines of Kuwait
 List of defunct airlines of Asia
 List of airports in Kuwait
 List of airlines

References

 
Kuwait
Airlines
Airlines
Kuwait